Panteleimon Oleksandrovych Kulish (also spelled Panteleymon or Pantelejmon Kuliš, August 7, 1819 – February 14, 1897) was a Ukrainian writer, critic, poet, folklorist, and translator.

Overview
Panteleimon Kulish, born 7 August 1819 in Voronizh (now in Sumy Oblast), d 14 February 1897 in Motronivka, Glukhovsky Uyezd Chernigov Governorate. Prominent writer, historian, ethnographer, and translator. He was born into an impoverished Cossack-gentry family. After completing only five years at the Novhorod-Siverskyi gymnasium he enrolled at  Kyiv University in 1837 but was not allowed to finish his studies because he was not a noble. He obtained a teaching position in Lutsk in 1840. There he wrote his first historical novel in Russian Mykhailo Charnyshenko, or Little Russia Eighty Years Ago (2 vols, 1843). Mykhailo Maksymovych promoted Kulish's literary efforts and published several of his early stories. His first longer work written in Ukrainian was the epic poem Ukraina (1843). In 1843–5 Kulish taught in Kyiv and studied Ukrainian history and ethnography. There he befriended Taras Shevchenko, Mykola Kostomarov, and Vasyl Bilozersky; their circle later became the nucleus of the secret Brotherhood of Saints Cyril and Methodius. Panteleimon Kulish was the first person known to translate the whole of the Bible into the modern Ukrainian language. His translation of the bible was published in Vienna in 1903 by the British and Foreign Bible Society.  
Kulish was also the first to write historical novels in Ukrainian. His most famous contribution in this field was the novel Chorna Rada (The Black Council) which was set in Cossack times. Kulish was also active in historical writing, composing a brief history of Ukraine in verse (under the title Ukraina) and a much larger History of the Reunification of Rus in three volumes. The latter dealt with the era of Hetman Bohdan Khmelnytsky in the seventeenth century. His two-volume collection of Ukrainian folklore, Notes on Southern Rus retains its scholarly significance to the present day.

Life
During his early years at the University of Kyiv, Kulish came under the influence of the historian and literary figure Mykhaylo Maksymovych who turned his attention to his native Ukrainian culture. In the 1840s, he became close to the poet Taras Shevchenko, and the historian Mykola Kostomarov and participated in the illegal Brotherhood of Saints Cyril and Methodius which envisioned a Ukrainian national rebirth, including national independence, within a free and equal Slavic federation.

In 1847, Kulish was arrested for his participation in this organization, and spent some time in prison and a few years in exile.

In the late 1850s, he was reunited with Kostomarov and others of the Cyril-Methodian "Brethren" and participated in the Ukrainian journal Osnova (The Foundation). At this time, he published his famous Notes on Southern Rus''' in which he pioneered a new Ukrainian orthography for the Ukrainian vernacular, the Kulishivka alphabet, based on phonetics rather than etymology. This later became the basis of the modern written Ukrainian language.

In the 1860s and 1870s, he gradually turned more conservative and began to criticize Shevchenko, the Cossack revolts, and the ideal of the Cossacks as the defenders of popular liberty. Eventually, despite Tsarist repression of Ukrainian culture and the ban on the appearance of the Ukrainian language in print, he developed a theory that Ukraine and Russia should be politically united but divergent in culture, an approach which won few adherents among the Ukrainian intelligentsia of the time. Nevertheless, this conservative approach to Ukrainian affairs was never completely extinguished and was later resurrected in a different form by other Ukrainian political thinkers such as Vyacheslav Lypynsky, Stepan Tomashivsky, and others.

In the 1880s, Kulish visited Austrian Galicia and, in light of the ban on Ukrainian publications in the Russian Empire, cooperated with the Ukrainian cultural and political leaders there. Thus he was one of the first Ukrainian figures to, at least in part, successfully bridge the gap between Russian and Austrian Ukraine.

He spent his last years isolated on his homestead in eastern Ukraine. During these years he translated a great deal of west European literature, including Shakespeare, into Ukrainian.

On 7 August 2019 a Google Doodle was created to celebrate Kulish's 200th birthday.

 Adaptations 
According to his novel Black Council, dedicated to the loss of Ukrainian independence in the 17th century, at the Dovzhenko Film Studios Mykola Zaseyev-Rudenko created the 9 series television series (2000).

Further reading
 George S. N. Luckyj, Panteleimon Kulish: A Sketch of his Life and Times'' (Boulder, Colo.: East European Monographs, 1983).

See also
Kulish's Bible

References

External links 
 Panteleimon Kulish at the Encyclopedia of Ukraine
 Panteleimon Kulish at the NANU Institute of History of Ukraine

1819 births
1897 deaths
People from Sumy Oblast
People from Glukhovsky Uyezd
Ukrainian people in the Russian Empire
Ukrainian nobility
Ukrainian writers
19th-century Ukrainian historians
Translators of the Bible into Ukrainian
Translators of William Shakespeare
Ukrainian ethnographers
19th-century translators
Brotherhood of Saints Cyril and Methodius members
Hromada (society) members
Ukrainian male writers
19th-century male writers
Translators of Adam Mickiewicz
Ukrainian translators